Anastasia Koval (born 6 November 1992 in Kyiv) is a Ukrainian artistic gymnast. She was a member of the 2007 Ukrainian world team and competed at the 2007 World Artistic Gymnastics Championships. She also competed at the 2008 Summer Olympics in the team and uneven bars individual events.

Competitive highlights
2007 World Artistic Gymnastics Championships team competition - 9th
Gymnastics at the 2008 Summer Olympics – Women's uneven bars - 5th

See also
List of Olympic female gymnasts for Ukraine

References

External links
 
 
 
 

1992 births
Living people
Ukrainian female artistic gymnasts
Gymnasts at the 2008 Summer Olympics
Olympic gymnasts of Ukraine
Universiade medalists in gymnastics
Universiade silver medalists for Ukraine
Medalists at the 2011 Summer Universiade
Gymnasts from Kyiv
21st-century Ukrainian women